William James Chaplin (1787–1859) was a stage coach proprietor who developed a large coaching business before the arrival of the railways. He has been called "perhaps the greatest coach proprietor that ever lived". His great rival was Edward Sherman.

Chaplin could see that the railways would destroy the coaching trade; he therefore shifted his investments into the London and Southampton Railway (which later changed its name to London and South Western Railway) and became the Deputy Chairman by 1840. He became the Chairman in 1843, a post he retained until 1858 (apart from a period between 1853 and 1854).

He was elected as Member of Parliament for Salisbury at the January 1847 by-election. He retained the seat at the general election in June of that year, but left the house at the next general election in 1857.

References

External links 
 
 
 http://numberonelondon.net/2010/03/the-english-mails-part-two/
 http://steamindex.com/people/managers2.htm#chaplin

1787 births
1859 deaths
English businesspeople
London and South Western Railway people
Whig (British political party) MPs for English constituencies
UK MPs 1841–1847
UK MPs 1847–1852
UK MPs 1852–1857
19th-century British businesspeople